The Intermediate League World Series Australia Region is one of six International regions that currently sends teams to the World Series in Livermore, California. The region's participation in the ILWS dates back to 2018.

Australia Region States

Region Champions
As of the 2022 Intermediate League World Series.

Results by State
As of the 2022 Intermediate League World Series.

See also
Australia Region in other Little League divisions
Little League
Junior League
Senior League

References

Australia
Baseball competitions in Australia